The Deutscher Sparkassen- und Giroverband (DSGV) is the association of German savings banks and the apex entity of the Sparkassen-Finanzgruppe, the European Union's second-largest financial services group (after BNP Paribas) with 2.4 trillion euros combined assets as of end-2021. Germany's savings banks, owned by local governments, play a major role in the country's economy, together operating some 15,860 branches and employing about 284,800 people.

History

In 1892, it was agreed that the  would be an "association of associations" whose members would not be individual savings banks, but rather regional associations thereof. By 1911, fifteen such  had been established, covering all the country's savings banks.

Unlike the prior DSGV in Berlin, it was not a public corporation (abbreviated as ö.K.) but a non-profit association (abbreviated e.V.).

Following German reunification, the DSGV relocated from Bonn to Berlin in 1999.

In April 2011, DSGV took control of DekaBank, buying a 50 percent stake from the Landesbanken, public sector banks such as HSH Nordbank, WestLB and  that stumbled badly during the financial crisis. After years of subsidising the activities of the Landesbank sector, savings banks have been more assertive about ending the Wall Street-style ambitions of some of these regional lenders.

Presidents
  (1924-1935)
 Johannes Heintze (1935-1945)
  (1947-1967)
  (1967-1972)
  (1972-1993)
 Horst Köhler (1993-1998)
  (1998-2006)
  (2006-2012)
 Georg Fahrenschon (2012-2017)
  (since 2018)

See also
 Bundesverband der Deutschen Volksbanken und Raiffeisenbanken

References

External links 

 Deutscher Sparkassen- und Giroverband
 

Banks of Germany
Banking organizations
Government-owned banks